Beyond the Gravy was a short-lived radio programme that aired in October 2004.  There were four 35-minute episodes and it was broadcast on BBC Radio 4. It starred David Bradley, Elizabeth Spriggs, and David Holt.

Notes and references
Lavalie, John. Beyond the Gravy. EpGuides. 21 Jul 2005. 29 Jul 2005  <https://web.archive.org/web/20071004201344/http://epguides.com/beyondthegravy/%3E.

BBC Radio comedy programmes
BBC Radio 4 programmes